Farewell, Home Sweet Home is a 1999 French comedy film directed by Otar Iosseliani. It was screened out of competition at the 1999 Cannes Film Festival.

Cast
 Nico Tarielashvili as Son
 Lily Lavina as Mother
 Philippe Bas as Moto driver
 Stephanie Hainque as Girl at bar
 Mirabelle Kirkland as Maid
 Amiran Amiranashvili as Hobo
 Joachim Salinger as Beggar
 Emmanuel de Chauvigny as Lover
 Otar Iosseliani as Father

References

External links

1999 films
1999 comedy films
French comedy films
1990s French-language films
Films directed by Otar Iosseliani
Louis Delluc Prize winners
European Film Awards winners (films)
1990s French films